FC Silmash Kharkiv was an association football club of the Ukrainian SSR and the Russian Empire that was created in 1910 as Sade FC.

The club played at its own stadiums.
 Champion of Kharkiv: 1913, 1917

Gelferikh Sade Factory
It represented the engine factory Gelferikh Sade that existed since 1875 in Kharkiv and produced agricultural equipment. In 1918 the factory was nationalised and in 1922 it was renamed Hammer and Sickle. Since the fall of the Soviet Union, the factory remained a state company. In 2005 it was announced bankrupt.

Soviet era
In 1919 Sade FC was reformed into FC Serp i Molot Kharkiv.

In 1936 the Sickle and Mallet Factory fielded another football team in the Soviet Group B championship called FC Silmash Kharkiv.

In 1941 the club was temporarily merged with FC Dynamo Kharkiv to form FC Spartak Kharkiv. Dynamo Kharkiv was dissolved as part of Dynamo sports society representation that took place in 1940 and included such clubs as FC Dynamo Odessa and FC Dynamo Dnipropetrovsk. Previously, another FC Spartak has already participated in the Soviet Group A competitions (later Soviet Top League), yet was dissolved upon relegation in 1938.

There is information that after World War II, FC Silmash Kharkiv was revived in lower league competitions, yet its further fate is uncertain.

League history

{|class="wikitable"
|-bgcolor="#efefef"
! Season
! Div.
! Pos.
! Pl.
! W
! D
! L
! GS
! GA
! P
!Domestic Cup
!colspan=2|Europe
!Notes
|-
|align=center|1936 (f)
|align=center|2nd
|align=center|8
|align=center|7
|align=center|0
|align=center|1
|align=center|6
|align=center|6
|align=center|24
|align=center|8
|align=center|
|align=center|
|align=center|
|align=center|as Serp i Molot Kharkiv
|-
|align=center|1937
|align=center|3rd
|align=center|8
|align=center|9
|align=center|3
|align=center|1
|align=center|5
|align=center|16
|align=center|29
|align=center|16
|align=center|
|align=center|
|align=center|
|align=center|
|-
|align=center|1938
|align=center|1st
|align=center|15
|align=center|25
|align=center|8
|align=center|6
|align=center|11
|align=center|34
|align=center|45
|align=center|22
|align=center|
|align=center|
|align=center|
|align=center|
|-
|align=center|1939
|align=center|2nd
|align=center|10
|align=center|22
|align=center|10
|align=center|4
|align=center|8
|align=center|38
|align=center|25
|align=center|24
|align=center|
|align=center|
|align=center|
|align=center|
|-
|align=center|1940
|align=center|2nd
|align=center|13
|align=center|26
|align=center|6
|align=center|5
|align=center|15
|align=center|41
|align=center|53
|align=center|17
|align=center|
|align=center|
|align=center|
|align=center|
|-bgcolor=grey
|align=center|1941
|align=center|1st
|align=center|14
|align=center|9
|align=center|2
|align=center|1
|align=center|6
|align=center|7
|align=center|19
|align=center|5
|align=center|
|align=center|
|align=center|
|align=center|as Spartak Kharkiv
|}

External links
 Helferikh-Sade Kharkiv. UkrSoccerHistory.com.

Sade FC
Sade FC
1910 establishments in Ukraine
1950s disestablishments in Ukraine
Association football clubs established in 1910
Association football clubs disestablished in the 1950s
Sade Kharkiv
Soviet Top League clubs
Football clubs in the Ukrainian Soviet Socialist Republic
Manufacturing association football clubs in Ukraine